is a retired Japanese sprinter who specialized in the 100 metres. She competed in the 4 × 100 meters relay at the 2003 World Championships and 2005 World Championships without qualifying for the final. She was the 2005 Japanese national champion in the 100 meters and former Japanese national record holder in the 4 × 100 meters relay.

She currently coach for the Hasegawa Sports Facilities Athletic Club.

Personal best

International competition

National title
Japanese Championships
100 m: 2005

References

External links

Tomoko Ishida at JAAF 
Tomoko Ishida at TBS  (archived)
Tomoko Ishida at Hasegawa Sports Facilities  (archived)

1977 births
Living people
Japanese female sprinters
Sportspeople from Saitama Prefecture
World Athletics Championships athletes for Japan
Athletes (track and field) at the 2006 Asian Games
Asian Games medalists in athletics (track and field)
Asian Games silver medalists for Japan
Medalists at the 2006 Asian Games
Japan Championships in Athletics winners
20th-century Japanese women
21st-century Japanese women